Ramey SC is a Puerto Rican association football club from Aguadilla that currently plays in the Liga Puerto Rico.

History
Ramey SC joined the nascent Liga Puerto Rico for the 2019/20 season which was eventually cancelled because of the COVID-19 pandemic.

Domestic history
Key

References

External links
Official Facebook profile
Liga Puerto Rico profile
Soccerway profile

Football clubs in Puerto Rico
Association football clubs established in 2004